The following is a list of past and current commercial operators of the Boeing 757, and any of its variants.

There were 625 Boeing 757 aircraft in service , comprising 572 757-200s and 53 757-300s. They are listed by variant in the following table.

Data as of April 1, 2022.

References

757
Operators